Cat Brooks is an American activist, playwright, poet and theater artist. She was a mayoral candidate in Oakland's 2018 election.

Early life and education
Brooks received her bachelor's degree from University of Nevada, Las Vegas, where she studied theater.

Career
After graduating, she began her acting studying at the National Royal Theater Studio in London, before moving to Los Angeles and working at Creative Artists Agency. In 2002, Brooks joined the nonprofit organization Community Coalition, where she focused on issues of education and racial justice.

After the shooting of Oscar Grant by a BART police officer, Brooks became active in organizing against police violence. She co-founded the Anti Police-Terror Project and served as the executive director for the Bay Area National Lawyers Guild. She also became an organizer for the Black Lives Matter movement. In 2015, Brooks was arrested protesting Oakland Mayor Libby Schaaf's ban on night-time marches on public roadways.

In 2018, Brooks was a candidate for mayor of Oakland,  running against the incumbent, Libby Schaaf. Her campaign involved collaborative assembly meetings intended to gather public feedback on local policies. She endorsed repealing the Costa-Hawkins Rental Housing Act. After taking a break for the duration of her unsuccessful mayoral campaign, Brooks resumed her job as co-host of the weekday morning program UpFront on Pacifica Radio station KPFA-FM in Berkeley.

Her one-woman show Tasha is loosely based on Natasha McKenna, who was tasered to death in police custody.

Personal life
Brooks was born in Las Vegas, Nevada, to a black father and a white mother. Brooks's mother was an anti-nuclear activist who took her to protests as a child.

She lives in West Oakland.

Electoral history

References

External links

 Official mayoral campaign website
 Anti Police Terror Project

African-American activists
Black Lives Matter people
American stage actresses
African-American actresses
African-American radio personalities
Pacifica Foundation people
Candidates in the 2018 United States elections
Politicians from Oakland, California
University of Nevada, Las Vegas alumni
1970s births
Living people
21st-century American actresses
Women civil rights activists
21st-century African-American women
21st-century African-American politicians
21st-century American politicians
20th-century African-American people
20th-century African-American women